The Department of Examinations is a non-ministerial government department of the Sri Lanka and the national examination service. It comes within the purview of the Ministry of Education. The department is responsible for carrying out public examinations such as the General Certificate of Education Ordinary Level (SL) and Advanced Level and other state sector examinations. It also carries out other examinations. 

The head of the department is Commissioner General Of Examinations. Commissioners, Deputy Commissioners and Assistant Commissioners of Examination form the assisting body to the Commissioner General.

See also
Ministry of Education

External links & reference
Department of Examinations, Sri Lanka
Public Examination Act of Sri Lanka

Examinations
Educational qualifications in Sri Lanka